The Florence Nightingale Community Hospital, formerly the London Road Community Hospital, is a community hospital on London Road in Derby, England. It is managed by the University Hospitals of Derby and Burton NHS Foundation Trust. The other main hospital in Derby is the Royal Derby Hospital.

History
The hospital was established to provide local community services in central Derby following the closure of Derbyshire Royal Infirmary in 2009. It is located further south-east along the London Road from the former infirmary site. Improvement works were carried out to consolidate services on the new site in 2011. It was renamed from the London Road Community Hospital to the Florence Nightingale Community Hospital in July 2021.

Services
The facility is a modern facility which provides community services including rehabilitation and intermediate care, inpatient facilities and some outpatient services.

References

NHS hospitals in England
Hospitals in Derby
Hospitals established in 2009
2009 establishments in England